Rithi Tehsil is located in Katni district.112 villages in rithi Tehsil

Rithi is a town which comes under the jurisdiction of Katni district, Madhya Pradesh, India. It is one of the tehsils of Katni. It is about 30 km from the district headquarters. Bhopal is the state capital for Rithi village. It is located around 290.1 kilometer away from Rithi.. The other nearest state capital from Rithi is Lucknow and its distance is 295.4 km, Ranchi 530.9 km., Patna 537.4 km.,

जनपद पंचायत रीठी (Rithi) : रीठी जनपद पंचायत कटनी जिला पंचायत के अंतर्गत आने वाली 6 जनपद पंचायतों मे से एक है | 
रीठी जनपद पंचायत के अंतर्गत 56 ग्राम पंचायत आती है |

Transport
Rithi is placed 30 km distance from katni.buses daily services in every half hour, and Railway station is here in Katni-Bina Rail Route,
Other Railway Stations Near Rithi

Bakhleta railway station	9.6 km.

Salaia railway station	19.8 km.

Katni Murwara railway station	25.8 km.

Katni railway station	26.6 km

Sunrise Time
Rithi village is located in the UTC 5.30 time zone and it follows Indian standard time(IST). Rithi sun rise time varies 9 minutes from IST. The vehicle driving side in Rithi is left, all vehicles should take left side during driving. Rithi people are using its national currency which is Indian Rupee and its international currency code is INR. Rithi phones and mobiles can be accessed by adding the Indian country dialing code +91 from abroad. Rithi people are following the dd/mm/yyyy date format in day-to-day life. Rithi domain name extension( country code top-level domain (cTLD)) is .in.

Nearest town/city to Rithi
Rithi's nearest town/city/important place is Vijayraghavgarh located at the distance of 30.0 kilometer. Surrounding town/city/TP/CT from Rithi are as follows.

Vijayraghavgarh	30.0 km.

Pawai	40.3 km.

Murwara	46.2 km.

Majholi	50.8 km.

Tehsil in Katni